The Berrechid–Beni Mellal expressway (A4) was inaugurated in 2015. It runs mainly parallel with the existing Route Nationale 11

History

Start of building

Financing
The total building costs are budgeted on 6.050 million Dirham and these investments are made via:
FADES: The Arab Fund for Social and Economical Development,
the European Investment Bank and the government of China. This investment will be retrieved via the income from the toll-road, the exploration of the rest- and service stations. Three service-stops will be built lying max. . apart from each other.
The five parts were meant to be built at the same time so that the whole road can be opened for traffic in 2013. However, due to expropriation issues, Khouribga - Beni Mellal section opened in 2014 and the inauguration of Berrechid - Khouribga section was postponed to 2015. 

This investment is part of the main-project plan 2008–2015 between the ADM and the government of Morocco. This masterplan was signed on 8 July 2008 during a formal meeting which was attended by King Mohammed VI of Morocco.

Construction

The first section between Berrechid and Ben Ahmed was built by China International Water & Electric Corporation (CWE). The second section, between Ben Ahmed and Khouribga, and the third section between Khouribga and Oued Zem, were built by four local Moroccan contractors: Sintram, LRN, Seprob and the SNCE. The fourth one between Oued Zem and Kasba Tadla was built by a Moroccan contractor, Houar. The fifth and last one, between Kasba Tadla and Beni Mellal was by another Chinese contractor, Covec.

Purpose
This expressway aims to support the development of Béni Mellal-Khénifra region and to reduce road traffic on the National road 11. This expressway links Beni Mellal, capital of Béni Mellal-Khénifra region, to Casablanca, the economic capital and the largest city in Morocco, serving the province of Khouribga, an area of great industrial potential thanks to large phosphate reserves. The Béni Mellal-Khénifra region's agricultural and tourism sectors are also expected to benefit from this expressway.

With traffic estimated at 3,700 vehicles per day (2018), the expressway serves the cities of Ben Ahmed, Khouribga, Oued Zem, Bejaad and Kasba Tadla. It includes 7 junction and 3 bridges across the Oum Errabiaa, Oued Derna and Oued Oum Errabia Bouqroum rivers as well as 28 underground and aerial passages.

Route

  Junction between A3 and A4 : Berrechid
 
  : Ben Ahmed
 
  : Khouribga
  : Oued Zem West
  : Oued Zem East
 
  : Bejaad
  : Kasba Tadla
  Toll station (km 173)
  :  Beni Mellal — N8

References and footnotes

Autoroutes in Morocco